Tank Overhaul is a Canadian documentary television program broadcast on the Military Channel (now American Heroes Channel) starting in 2007. Episodes are filmed at the Isle of Wight Military Museum as well as other organizations specializing in military history vehicle restoration and preservation.

Canadian actor Andrew Pifko narrated the eight episodes of the show.

Episodes

Season 1: 2007

Season 2: 2009

References
TV Guide episode listing
IMDB entry
AOL television listing
Military channel episode listing
Military channel episode listing Retrieved 15 March 2009, showing season 2.

External links 
 
 Windup Filmworks
 Isle of Wight Military Museum
 Imperial War Museum, Duxford
 Military Vehicle Technology Foundation
 

Canadian military television series
2007 Canadian television series debuts
2000s Canadian documentary television series
American Heroes Channel original programming